Madame Aema 7 (애마부인 7 - Aema Buin 7) is a 1992 South Korean film directed by Suk Do-won. It was the seventh entry in the Madame Aema series, the longest-running film series in Korean cinema.

Plot
In this episode in the long-running Madame Aema series, Aema leaves her selfish, middle-aged husband to pursue a career as an actress. She meets a performance artist who persuades her to perform perverted sex acts in the name of art. Finally, repenting of her decision, she returns to her husband.

Cast
 Kang Seung-mi: Aema
 Lee Moo-jung: Hyeon-woo
 Won Seok: Won Seok
 Yoo Seong
 Park Hye-ran: Rubia
 Han Yeong-nam
 Kim Yun-hui: Miss Choe
 Gil Dal-ho
 Seo Eok-seok
 Kwang Bok-dong

Bibliography

English

Korean

Notes

Madame Aema
1992 films
1990s erotic films
1990s Korean-language films
South Korean sequel films